Graham Island is the largest island in the Haida Gwaii archipelago (previously known as the Queen Charlotte Islands), lying off the mainland coast of British Columbia, Canada. It is separated by the narrow Skidegate Channel from the other principal island of the group to the south, Moresby Island (T'aaxwii X̱aaydag̱a Gwaay.yaay linag̱waay in the language of the Haida people).

Graham Island was named in 1853 by James Charles Prevost, commander of HMS Virago, for Sir James Graham, 2nd Baronet, who was First Lord of the Admiralty at the time.

Communities
 Daajing Giids (formerly known as Queen Charlotte City)
 Juskatla
 Masset
 Old Massett
 Port Clements
 Skidegate
 Tlell

Attractions
 Naikoon Provincial Park
 North Beach https://www.ehcanadatravel.com/british-columbia/haidagwaii/parks-trails/4715-north-beach-naikoon-provincial-park.html
 Kano Inlet

See also 
 List of islands of British Columbia

References

Sea islands, Natural Resources Canada Atlas of Canada